Bob Dixon (born May 27, 1969) is an American Republican politician currently serving as Presiding Commissioner of Greene County, Missouri. He formerly served in the Missouri House of Representatives and Missouri State Senate.

A resident of Springfield, Missouri, Dixon was first elected to the House in 2002 and served four terms. Between 2004 and 2008 he served as Majority Caucus Chairman and chaired the House Transportation Committee.

Academic background
Dixon has a Master of Education degree in Human Services and a Bachelor of Science degree in Business Administration, both from Drury University. Dixon graduated high school from the Christian Schools of Springfield. He is a member of the Alpha Xi Chapter of Alpha Sigma Lambda National Honor Society.

Personal life
Dixon lived as a homosexual for five years as a teenager, attributing his sexual orientation to abuse he endured as a child.  In his early 20s, he renounced homosexuality and declared himself heterosexual.  He is currently married and he and his wife, Amanda, have three daughters: Grace, Rose, and Olivia. They live in Springfield, Missouri where they are regular members of a local church.

Dixon is a licensed realtor, and he also teaches online classes at Drury University.

Organization memberships
Dixon is member to the Rogersville, Springfield, and Strafford chambers of commerce, as well as the Missouri Farm Bureau, the James River Basin Partnership, the North Springfield Betterment Association, the Kiwanis Club of Springfield North, and the American Legislative Exchange Council (ALEC).

Dixon serves on the board of trustees of the History Museum for Springfield-Greene County, the board of Directors of the Girl Scouts of Dogwood Trails Council, Inc. and the Board of Associates of New Covenant Academy. Dixon and his wife also serve on the Association of Evangel University Family and Friends Executive Council. (edited)

Political career
Dixon is a conservative and is part of the Republican Party. He most recently won the election for the Greene County Presiding Commissioner in 2018.

Committee and task force service
Dixon is serving or has served on the following House committees:

National Conference of State Legislatures
Standing Committee on Economic Development
Trade and Cultural Affairs
Criminal Justice Task Force
Internet Cyber Crime Task force

Electoral history
Dixon briefly entered the 2016 gubernatorial election, announcing his bid in July 2015 and then dropping out of the race four months later.

References

Official Manual, State of Missouri  Jefferson City, MO: Secretary of State.

External links
Missouri State House of Representatives
Dixon's Campaign Site
Official Site

Living people
Politicians from Springfield, Missouri
Drury University alumni
Republican Party Missouri state senators
Republican Party members of the Missouri House of Representatives
21st-century American politicians
1969 births